"Come Together Now" is a charity single made to benefit the victims of the 2004 Indian Ocean earthquake and Hurricane Katrina in 2005. The song was written by Sharon Stone, Damon Sharpe, Mark Feist, and Denise Rich and released on November 21, 2005.

Song information 
The song's origin was an inspiration by the magnitude of human suffering and tragedy that touched so many lives after the tsunami disaster in December 2004. In Hurricane Katrina's wake Stone, Sharpe, Feist, and Rich used the song as a combined effort to raise funds for the two global tragedies. Feist and Sharpe also served as producers. Mark Feist also wrote the musical arrangement.

Performers 
The line-up of artists includes:

 Céline Dion
 The Game
 JoJo
 Jesse McCartney
 Nick Carter (Backstreet Boys)
 A. J. McLean (Backstreet Boys)
 John Legend
 Joss Stone
 Mýa
 Gavin DeGraw
 Chingy
 Wyclef Jean
 Ruben Studdard
 Stacie Orrico
 Kimberley Locke
 Anthony Hamilton
 Patti LaBelle
 Natalie Cole
 Aaron Carter
 Brian McKnight
 Kelly Price
 Angie Stone
 Garou
 Tren'l
 Glenn Lewis
 Lee Ryan (Blue)
 R.L. Huggard

The following musicians played on the song:
 Mark Feist – keyboards, drums, Moog bass, synth programming
 Steve Lukather – guitar
 Abe Laboriel, Jr. – drums
 Greg Phillinganes – acoustic grand piano

Strings were arranged and conducted by Bill Meyers. Jon Gass served as engineer.

Track listings and formats 
Digital download
"Come Together Now" – 4:37

U.S. CD single
"Come Together Now" (Main) – 4:37
"Come Together Now" (No Rap) – 4:40
"Come Together Now" (Video) – 4:37

Charts

Legacy 
Over four years after the song was released, numerous contemporary Christian singers collaborated to compose a similar song with the same title to support the victims of the 2010 Haiti earthquake.

References

External links 
 

2005 singles
All-star recordings
Hurricane Katrina disaster relief charity singles
Songs written by Denise Eisenberg Rich
Songs written by Damon Sharpe
2005 songs
Columbia Records singles
Epic Records singles
Songs written by Mark J. Feist